The King-Hooton House  is a historic home in Pensacola, Florida. It is located at 512–514 North Seventh Avenue. On August 23, 1991, it was added to the U.S. National Register of Historic Places.

The King-Hooton House is an 1871, -story,
frame vernacular residence, with an attached kitchen wing.
Originally built as a single dwelling, it was converted into
a duplex in the mid-1950s. It was built by a local
carpenter for Margaret E. King, one of Pensacola's most
prominent real estate holders in the late nineteenth
century. It has three interior, stuccoed, brick chimneys
which pierce front gabled roofs; an inset porch at the main
entrance; and an attached hip roofed porch on the south
elevation. Paired brackets accent the eaves of the main
house. A bay window dominates the main facade; nearly all
of the other windows are wooden, double hung, 6/6 sash.
There are two jib windows. Sixteen pairs of original,
wooden, louvered shutters remain intact and are operable.

References

External links
 Escambia County listings at National Register of Historic Places
 Escambia County listings at Florida's Office of Cultural and Historical Programs

Gallery

Houses on the National Register of Historic Places in Florida
Buildings and structures in Pensacola, Florida
National Register of Historic Places in Escambia County, Florida
Houses in Escambia County, Florida
Vernacular architecture in Florida
1871 establishments in Florida
Houses completed in 1871